The 1983 Amstel Gold Race was the 18th edition of the annual road bicycle race "Amstel Gold Race", held on Sunday April 23, 1983, in the Dutch province of Limburg. The race stretched 242 kilometres, with the start in Heerlen and the finish in Meerssen. There were a total of 156 competitors, and 57 cyclists finished the race.

Result

External links
Results

Amstel Gold Race
April 1983 sports events in Europe
1983 in road cycling
1983 in Dutch sport
1983 Super Prestige Pernod